Esajas is a surname. It may refer to:

Dion Esajas (born 1980), Dutch footballer
Etiënne Esajas (born 1984), Dutch footballer
Harvey Esajas (born 1974), Dutch footballer
Malcolm Esajas (born 1986), Dutch footballer
Wim Esajas (1935–2005), Surinamese middle-distance runner

See also:

Esajas Zweifel (1827–1904), Swiss politician